Diamante is a city in the west of the province of Entre Ríos, Argentina, on the eastern shore of the Paraná River. It is the head town of the Diamante Department.

The town of Diamante was founded on 27 February 1836, and became a first-class municipality on 13 May 1872.

References
 
 TurismoEntreRios.com - Tourism portal of Entre Ríos.

External links

Populated places in Entre Ríos Province
Paraná River
Cities in Argentina
Entre Ríos Province
Argentina